The Estadio Manuel Ferreira, known as Estadio Tigo Manuel Ferreira due to sponsorship by telecommunications company Tigo, is a football stadium in Asunción, Paraguay. It is the home venue of Club Olimpia and is named after former club president Manuel Ferreira Sosa.

The stadium was opened in May 1965 with a friendly match between Olimpia and Santos FC of Brazil, whose team included Pelé. The excitement to see Pelé playing was so great that the stadium's capacity was exceeded. During the game, one of the fences supporting the crowd in the stands broke and many people were injured. As soon as the incident happened, Pelé ran and jumped over the fence to help the injured people. Only minor injuries occurred and the match proceeded, ending in a 2–2 draw.

Though the stadium is the home ground of Club Olimpia, the Defensores del Chaco stadium is used for major derbies against their rivals such as Cerro Porteño because of its greater capacity.

The stadium is nicknamed "The Forest of Stop One" on account of its surroundings constituting large, tall trees, and the location having been the first stop of a now defunct Paraguayan train.

See also
List of association football stadiums by capacity
Olimpia Asunción

Concerts

References

External links
 Estadio Manuel Ferreira Info

Sports venues completed in 1964
Football venues in Asunción
Sports venues in Asunción
Estadio Manuel Ferreira